Anarsia choana is a moth of the family Gelechiidae. It was described by Kyu-Tek Park in 1995. It is found in Taiwan and Japan (Ryukyus).

The forewings are creamy white, speckled with pale brownish grey and scattered with blackish scales. There is a blackish dot on the extreme base of the costa. The hindwings are pale brownish grey, hyaline on the basal half and with the veins darker.

References

choana
Moths described in 1995
Moths of Asia